The Skate Canada International is an international, senior-level invitation-only figure skating competition organized by Skate Canada. It is the second competition of the ISU Grand Prix of Figure Skating season. The location changes yearly. Medals are awarded in four disciplines: men's singles, ladies' singles, pair skating, and ice dancing. The first Skate Canada International was held in 1973. The 1987 competition in Calgary was the test event for the 1988 Winter Olympic Games. It was added to the Grand Prix series in 1995, the year the series began.

It has had different title sponsors over the years. On August 30, 2006, Skate Canada announced it would be officially titled HomeSense Skate Canada International until 2010.

Medalists

Men

Ladies

Pairs

Ice dancing

Fours

References

External links

 2006 Official site
 2007 Official site
 2008 Official site
 2006 HomeSense Skate Canada International at Skate Canada
 2008 HomeSense Skate Canada International at Skate Canada
 2009 HomeSense Skate Canada International at Skate Canada
 Comprehensive pairs result

 
ISU Grand Prix of Figure Skating
International figure skating competitions hosted by Canada
Recurring sporting events established in 1973
1973 establishments in Canada